Brigadier General Richard Kane (1662–1736) was an Irish soldier who served in the British Army. He is particularly associated with the island of Minorca.

Origins
Born to Thomas O'Cahan and his wife, Margaret Dobbin, at his mother's home in Duneane, County Antrim, in Ulster, Ireland, in December 1662. At the age of 26, he anglicised his name to Kane and joined a volunteer Protestant regiment in his home town, Carrickfergus, raised to oppose James II's Catholic rule.

The Nine Years' War and the War of the Spanish Succession
Kane enlisted as a Lieutenant in the Antrim Volunteers, part of the Army of the North. This was a scratch force of Protestants raised to oppose the Royal Irish Army which was loyal to James II.

Kane took part in the defence of Derry in 1689. Shortly afterwards, he joined the Earl of Meath's Regiment (later the Royal Irish Regiment, and otherwise known as the 18th Regiment) and fought in William III's campaigns in Ireland. He was present at the Battle of the Boyne and Siege of Limerick in 1690.

His regiment was singled out in recognition of its bravery during the 1695 siege of Namur at which he was wounded. In 1702, William died and the Duke of Marlborough took command of the army. Kane fought under Marlborough in many bloody battles of the War of the Spanish Succession and was severely wounded at Blenheim. In December 1710, Queen Anne named him colonel of his own regiment of foot (formerly the regiment of the disgraced George Macartney), which was finally disbanded in 1717.

In 1711, Kane sailed to Canada in an unsuccessful expedition under General Jack Hill to take Quebec from the French. On that voyage, he visited Boston. In the following year he commanded British troops in a takeover of the town of Dunkirk which ended disastrously when an epidemic killed half of the men.

Menorca and Gibraltar
In the summer of 1712, Queen Anne signed orders for the Duke of Argyll to proceed to the Spanish island of Menorca as its Governor. Menorca had been captured by the British in 1708 and under the terms of the peace treaty then being negotiated, the island would remain in British hands. Argyll remained titular governor for the next three years, but the work was really for Richard Kane, the lieutenant governor. He arrived 10 November 1712 and remained on the island, apart from a few absences, until his death twenty four years later.

In Menorca, against the interference of the Roman Catholic Church and always short of funds, Kane reformed the legal system, drew up a new constitution, built a road connecting the old Spanish capital, Ciudadela, with Mahón, the new capital, and improved trade by making Mahon a free port. He introduced new agricultural methods and imported new varieties of cereal, new breeds of cattle and drought-resistant clover to feed them.

In 1720–1721, he was appointed Lieutenant Governor of Gibraltar when it was threatened by Spain and, in 1725, George I ordered Kane to Gibraltar again to strengthen the defences and ward off Spanish invaders. This he did, at the same time recommending a civil government for "the Rock". George I rewarded him in 1725 for his work by giving him the colonelcy of a regiment (later the 9th Regiment of Foot). Kane returned to Menorca in February 1727, just before the Spanish launched an unsuccessful siege on Gibraltar.

He was formally appointed Governor of Menorca in 1733 and given the rank of brigadier general in 1735. He was not knighted. Richard Kane died in Mahon on 31 December 1736 after almost twenty five years of devoted service on the island. He was buried in the chapel of St. Philip's Castle which was later bombed by the Spanish. A bust by J. M. Ruysback with a Latin inscription listing his many achievements is in Westminster Abbey. Although an excellent soldier, Kane is best remembered as a colonial administrator devoted to the people in his care.

Memorial at Westminster Abbey

In the west aisle of the north transept in Westminster Abbey is a memorial to Kane by the sculptor John Michael Rysbrack. It consists of a monument in white, grey and black marbles with a bust in armour with shoulder length hair on a pedestal. The Latin inscription can be translated:

"Sacred to the memory of Richard Kane laid to rest at the citadel of the Balearic island of Menorca named for Saint Philip, who was born on December 20, 1666, at Duneane in County Antrim. In 1689, he served his military apprenticeship in the famous siege of Derry, whereafter, under William III of blessed memory, he continued in armed service both at home, until the subjugation of all Ireland, and abroad, in Flanders, at great risk of life, not least by reason of a grave wound received at the siege of Namur. In 1702, when war broke out afresh in the reign of Queen Anne, again he campaigned in Belgium before joining the expedition to Canada. In 1712, under the renowned Duke of Argyll and Greenwich, and later under Baron Carpenter, he acted as civil governor of Menorca where, capably undertaking all tasks, both civil and military, and in command of army and navy alike, he planned, ordered and maintained everything that was necessary, expedient or beneficial for the preservation of the island, in war and in peace, on sea and on land, and also had paved, fortified and adorned a truly royal road throughout the length of an island hitherto impassable. In 1720, at the behest of George I, he crossed from Mahon to Gibraltar and thwarted an attack by the Spaniards who planned to take it by surprise. In 1725, he returned to the same scene of action for eighteen months and, when the enemy laid the Peninsula under heavy siege, quashed their every hope of taking it. After this sequence of sterling achievements as Lieutenant Governor in 1733 at the command of George II neither by his own seeking nor with prior knowledge, as with his other offices wheresoever held, he was elevated to the supreme command in Menorca. But oh, oh, how uncertain is the life of man! He who under four sovereigns had borne arms with the greatest shrewdness, courage and dignity, who had served God with all his heart and played the role not less of a Christian than of a good soldier, of pure faith and old-fashioned courtesy, dear to his friends, amiable to his associates, affable to his people, kind and generous to all, and in all things concerned more for the public good than for his own, left an island that was both British and Spanish sadly mourning his loss and in his seventy sixth year on December 19, 1736, breathed his last."

Bibliography
He left a Narrative of All the Campaigns of King William and the Duke of Marlborough and wrote A New System of Military Discipline for Foot on Action which became the British army's "bible" at the time.

References

|-

|-

1662 births
1736 deaths
Governors of Gibraltar
British Army brigadiers
People from Carrickfergus
British military personnel of the War of the Spanish Succession
Royal Irish Regiment (1684–1922) officers
British military personnel of the Anglo-Spanish War (1727–1729)
Irish colonial officials
Military personnel from County Antrim